Dust of Angels is a 1992 Taiwanese crime film directed by Hsu Hsiao-ming, executive produced by Taiwanese filmmaker Hou Hsiao-hsien. It was entered into Directors' Fortnight at the 1992 Cannes Film Festival. "An lah" is a Taiwanese Hokkien colloquialism; the title in full roughly translates to "take it easy, lad" or "cool it, kid."

Plot
The story depicts the changes in Taiwanese society under the influence of economic growth, particularly portraying the rapid increase of youth violence. The setting ranges from Beigang-zhen, Yunlin County, to Taipei, Wanhua District, Ximending. The simple town is compared with the bustling metropolis as a metaphor of the erosion of society and its changing values.

Beigang teenagers A-guo and A-douzi spend their days fighting and causing trouble in karaoke joints, hanging around in the billiard rooms, taking drugs, and generally loafing and playing all day. Little Gao, bro Jie, their friend from Beigang, has made something of a name for himself in Taipei, and brings his girl Meimei back to Beigang.  A-guo and A-douzi accidentally grab a bag with guns and drugs, and head for Taipei looking for brother Jie.

Cast
 Jack Kao as Little Kao, bro Jie (小高／捷哥)
 Yen Zhenguo as A-Guo
 Tan Zhigang (zh) as A-Douzi
 Vicky Wei as Mei-Mei
 Chen Sung-young as Guo's brother-in-law
 Lee Hsing-wen as A-Wen
 Tsai Chen-nan as A-Nan
 Chang Shih as Killer
 Blackie Ko
 Lim Giong as Club Singer (cameo appearance)
 Lo Ta-yu as Club Singer (cameo appearance)

Soundtrack

The soundtrack features ten Taiwanese, instrumental rock and ambient music songs by performers considered to be alternative or avant-garde in the Taiwanese music scene at the time. Some of the contributors to the album united in the mid-2000s for the series of Taike Rock Concerts (台客搖滾演唱會).

Popular singer Lim Giong's "A Soundless Place" (無聲的所在) performed with Hou Hsiao-hsien (the movie's producer) became a popular Taiwanese staple.  Rock singer-songwriter Wu Bai who achieved immense popularity in East Asia the late 1990s and 2000s, contributed two songs including the title track under his given name of Wu Chun-lin.  These songs represented Wu Bai's first major commercial music release and featured two of the three members of his band, China Blue.  Fellow Taike performers Baboo contributed three songs and had backing roles on several of the others on the album.  Chinese jazz saxophonist Liu Yuan also performed one of the album's songs.

For the 29th Golden Horse Awards in 1992, the soundtrack was nominated for a Golden Horse in the category of Best Original Film Music, losing to the soundtrack for Rebels of the Neon God.  The song "Dust of Angels" was also nominated for the Best Original Film Song award the same year.

  "A Soundless Place" (無聲的所在 Bô-siaⁿ ê só·-chāi) by Lim Giong & Hou Hsiao-hsien (林強&侯孝賢)
 Also translated as "A Place of Silence" 
  "Lighting a Cigarette" (點煙 Tiám ian) by Wu Chun-lin (吳俊霖)
  "You're the Meanest" (你真正上厲害 Lí chin-chiàⁿ siong lī-hāi) by Lim Giong (林強)
  "Cool It, Boy" (少年安 Siàu-liān an) by Baboo
  "Dreaming Peach Flowers" (Instrumental) (夢桃花 Bāng thô-hoe) by Liu Yuan (劉元)
  "Dust of Angels" (少年也，安啦！Siàu-liān-ê àn-la) by Wu Chun-lin (吳俊霖)
  "All the Lamp-posts" (電火柱仔 Tiān-hé thiāu-á) by Baboo
  "Come Get Money, Everybody" (赶緊來賺錢 Koáⁿ-kín lâi thàn-chîⁿ) by Lim Giong (林強)
  "Instrumental" (演奏曲 Ián-chàu khek) by Baboo
  "The One in My Dream" (夢中人 Bāng-tiong lâng) by Hou Hsiao-hsien (侯孝賢)

References

Further reading
 Continuum Encyclopedia of Popular Music of the World Part 2 0826474365 John Shepherd, David Horn, Dave Laing – 2005 "Taiwan. Lim Giong, Baboo, Wu Pai, and Hou Hsiao-hsien. Siao-lien-e An-na! [Dust of Angels] (Original Soundtrack). Pony Canyon PCTA 00004.

External links

1992 films
Taiwanese crime drama films
1990s Mandarin-language films
1992 crime drama films
Films directed by Hsu Hsiao-ming